First Church, Old First Church, or First Church Parsonage may refer to:

in New Zealand
First Church of Otago, Dunedin

in the United States (by state)
First Church Parsonage (Windsor, Connecticut), listed on the National Register of Historic Places (NRHP) in Connecticut
First Church in Boston, Boston Massachusetts 
First Church and Parish in Dedham, Massachusetts
First Church (Exeter, New Hampshire), listed on the NRHP in New Hampshire
Old First Church (Huntington, New York), listed on the NRHP in New York
First Church in Oberlin, listed on the NRHP in Ohio
Old First Church (Sandusky, Ohio), listed on the NRHP in Ohio

See also
First Church Congregational, Methuen, Massachusetts, United States
First Church of Christ, Congregational (disambiguation)
First Church of Christ, Scientist (disambiguation)